The nutcrackers (Nucifraga) are a genus of three species of passerine bird, in the family Corvidae, related to the jays and crows.

The genus Nucifraga was introduced by the French zoologist Mathurin Jacques Brisson in 1760 with the spotted nutcracker (Nucifraga caryocatactes) as the type species.  The genus name is a New Latin translation of German  Nussbrecher, "nut-breaker".

Extant species 
The genus contains three species:

The most important food resources for these species are the seeds (pine nuts) of various pines (Pinus sp.), principally the cold-climate (far northern or high altitude) species of white pine (Pinus subgenus Strobus) with large seeds: P. albicaulis, P. armandii, P. cembra, P. flexilis, P. koraiensis, P. parviflora, P. peuce, P. pumila, P. sibirica and P. wallichiana, and also the pinyon and lacebark pines. In some regions, where none of these pines occur, the seeds of spruce (Picea sp.) and hazelnuts (Corylus sp.) form an important part of the diet too. Their bills are specialized tools for extracting seeds from pine cones.

Surplus seed is always stored for later use, and it is this genus that is responsible for the re-establishment of their favoured pines over large areas either burnt in forest fires or cleared by man. The nutcracker can store as many as 30,000 pine nuts in a single season, remembering the location of as many as 70% of their stash, even when buried in snow.

Various insects are also taken, including bee and wasp larvae, and also birds' eggs and nestlings, and carrion if it is found.

Nesting is always early in this genus, so as to make the best use of pine nuts stored the previous autumn. The nest is usually built high in a conifer. There are normally 2–4 eggs laid and incubated for 18 days. Both sexes feed the young which are usually fledged by about 23 days and stay with their parents for many months, following them to learn food storage techniques.

None of the species are migratory, but they will leave their usual ranges if a cone crop failure causes a food shortage.

References

External links
 Nutcracker videos on the Internet Bird Collection